In June 1905, between 900 and 1850 ethnic Kipsigis men, women and children were killed in a punitive expedition dubbed Sotik expedition by the colonial British government forces led by Major Pope Hennessy. This was as a result of a raid by the Kipsigis on the Maasai which saw the Kipsigis part with Maasai cows, women and children to which the government demanded redress and return of the spoils of the raid but to which the Kipsigis returned in insults and turned down the warning. In effect, this led to alienation of tribal land to what would become part of Kenyan White Highlands.

The Kipsigis 
The Kipsigis are one of Kenya's 47 tribes and together with Nandi, Tugen, Marakwet, Sengwer, Pokot and Sebei, they make up the Kalenjin ethnic identity. Their origin is estimated to about 18th century as a break away group from the Nandi which occupied southern portions of Nandi Hills and today's Kipekelion and Belgut constituencies in Kericho County. Their population would however multiply and due to their warring attributes, they would go on to assimilate many groups from Maasai, Luo and Kisii.

By late 19th century, their military efforts had seen the Kipsigis expulse the Massai, Luo and Abagusii and dispossessed their claim upon the land and looted their livestock and crops. This was especially as a result of military efforts and leadership by commanders including Menya Araap Kisiara and the three brothers of Koitalel Araap Samoei (Kipchomber araap Koilege, Chebochok Kiptonui arap Boisio and Kibuigut). By the time of the arrival of the British, the Kipsigis were exclusively occupying what is today's Bomet county, Kericho County, Narok West Constituency and parts of Nakuru and Nyamira counties.

The Massacre 
Originally not part of the White Highlands, Sotik District was a Y-shaped strip of land about 50 miles and in some places not more than three miles wide, carved out of the Native Reserve. Sotik was Abugusii and Maasai territory before 1800 but, under a treaty promulgated by Menya Araap Kisiara, the Maasai were pushed to Trans-Mara. Following the arrival of the British, the Kipsigis rallied alongside the Nandis to fight against the building of the Kenya-Uganda Railway. Seeing the long-drawn-out resistance of the Nandi led by Koitalel Araap Samoei, the intelligence officer Richard Meinertzhagen, vowed to break the impasse.

Shortly after the creation of Maasai reserve and relocation of some of the ethnic Maasai as a result, the Kipsigis raided the Maasai and stole cattle, women and children. Attempts to negotiate the return of the Masai captives, and their cattle failed, and provoked The British East Africa Protectorate government to organise an expedition, against the Sotik. The punitive raid was led by Major Pope Hennessy and killed between 900 and 1,850 men, women, and children with a Maxim gun and other weapons. While recovering 20,000 head of cattle, along with a number of captive Masai Women and children.

Shortly before and after Sotik massacre, (between 1905 and 1906 ), a punitive party was dispatched to fight the Nandi; commanded by Lt. Col. E.G.Harrison and comprised 540 men from 1KAR, 780 men from 3KAR 260 armed Police, 1,000 Masai levies, 100 Somalis, 500 armed porters, 8460 unarmed porters and 10 machine guns. Against this large force the Nandi had their traditional weapons and a few firearms. The Nandi had 750 killed and 30,000 cattle and goats captured whilst H.M. Forces casualties were 90 killed and wounded. The Nandi as a result were moved into a smaller reserve.

The expedition was reported, in London, as follows:

British East Africa called for peace negotiations between the Nandi and the British following a protracted 10-year long guerilla resistance. Upon their meet, Richard Meinheirtzhagen shot Koitalel Araap Samoei point blank on the head thus ending the resistance.

Impacts and Implications 
Following the attainment of the mission objectives and their success, medal of honours were awarded to officers who took part in the operation. The party had been allocated £20,000 but following their raid, they seized 20,000 head of cattle to which each was sold at £3 thus amounting to £60,000 which was £40,000 in profit.

It was also as a result of both the assassination of Orkoiyot Koitalel Araap Samoei and the massacres of Sotik and Nandi that the British administration felt that all of Talai clansmen should be exiled. This operation saw hundreds of Talai clan members living among the Kipsigis evacuated to Rusinga island in Kisumu where many of them died due to malaria and became subject to pedigree collapse as there were no unrelated choices for pairing. Apparently, the three brothers of Koitalel were handed life exile in Fort Hall, Nyeri until their deaths.

Redress 
In August 2020, following the murder of George Floyd, Claudia Webbe, Member of Parliament for Leicester East wrote in a letter addressed to UK's Secretary of State for Education, Gavin Williamson about Sotik Massacre and asked that the massacre should be taught in British schools.

References 

Massacres in 1905
1905 in the British Empire
Massacres in Kenya
1905 murders in Africa
Massacres committed by the United Kingdom
Kipsigis people
1900s in Kenya